Dotsenko is a gender-neutral Ukrainian surname. It may refer to the following notable people:
 Anastasia Dotsenko (born 1986), Russian cross-country skier
 Igor Dotsenko (1953–2014), Ukrainian-Russian musician
 Ihor Dotsenko (born 1974), Ukrainian-American footballer
 Maria Dotsenko (born 1967), Ukrainian diplomat
 Rostyslav Dotsenko (1931–2012), Ukrainian translator and literary critic
 Sergei Dotsenko (1947–2006), Soviet football player and coach
 Serhiy Dotsenko (born 1979), Ukrainian boxer
 Vadim Dotsenko (born 1988), Belgian footballer
 Viktor Dotsenko, Russian author

See also
 

Ukrainian-language surnames